Joseph Luechai Thatwisai (born December 2, 1962,) is appointed Roman Catholic Bishop of Udon Thani diocese.

Joseph Luechai Thatwisai was ordained a priest in 1990. He obtains a pontifical degree in Scripture and was professor of biblical theology at Thailand's Saeng Tham National Major Seminary from 2000 to 2006. Afterwards he earned a PhD in biblical studies at the Catholic Institute of Paris. Since 2008 he was secretary of the Thai bishops’ Catholic Commission for the Bible commission.

Pope Benedict XVI made the episcopal appointment on November 14, 2009.  He was ordained a bishop by his predecessor, Bishop George Yod Phimphisan, C.Ss.R., on February 6, 2010.

References

External links 
 Joseph Luechai Thatwisai on catholic-hierarchy.org

Joseph Luechai Thatwisai
1962 births
Living people